Wang Xueyi (Chinese: 王雪毅; born 3 August 1991) is a Chinese high jumper. She won a silver medal at the 2017 Asian Championships and placed fourth at the 2018 Asian Games.

References

Chinese female long jumpers
1991 births
Living people
Athletes (track and field) at the 2018 Asian Games
Asian Games competitors for China
21st-century Chinese women